Saint-Castin is a commune in the Pyrénées-Atlantiques department in south-western France. It is located about 15 km north of Pau and 12 km east of Pau-Pyrenees Airport.

The village was the home of the Abbadie de Saint-Castin family of Canadian settlers.

See also
Communes of the Pyrénées-Atlantiques department

References

Communes of Pyrénées-Atlantiques